David B. Duncan (born 1960) is a former partner of Arthur Andersen, and was the United States government's star witness in the Arthur Andersen trial. He has said fears over interpretation prompted him to order the shredding of documents relating to Enron.

He was an Andersen employee for 20 years and had been the firm's lead partner on the Enron account since 1997, for which he was paid over $1 million.  He was fired from Andersen in January 2002 and charged with obstruction of justice for ordering Andersen staff to shred over a ton of papers related to Enron.  On April 9, 2002, he pleaded guilty; the maximum sentence for his crimes is ten years, but since he pleaded guilty and became a witness for the prosecution he would have presumably received a much smaller sentence. His sentencing date was postponed numerous times. He currently resides in Houston, Texas and has three daughters.

He withdrew his guilty plea on December 12, 2005, after  the overturning of the Arthur Andersen conviction. This was approved by U.S. District Judge Melinda Harmon.

In January 2008 he settled charges with the SEC that he violated securities laws.

In November 2011, The Houston Chronicle/Fuelfix reported that Duncan was Vice President and Chief Financial Officer of Houston-based U.S. Pipeline.

References

1960 births
Living people
Enron scandal
American accountants
Crime witnesses

20th-century American businesspeople